Koszary may refer to the following places:
Koszary, Lesser Poland Voivodeship (south Poland)
Koszary, Nisko County in Subcarpathian Voivodeship (south-east Poland)
Koszary, Sanok County in Subcarpathian Voivodeship (south-east Poland)
Koszary, Radom County in Masovian Voivodeship (east-central Poland)
Koszary, Zwoleń County in Masovian Voivodeship (east-central Poland)
Koszary, Greater Poland Voivodeship (west-central Poland)
Koszary, Pomeranian Voivodeship (north Poland)